Charles Sleeper (1856-1924) was an American physician, state legislator, and Collector of the Port of Portland, Maine.

Sleeper graduated from the Medical School of Maine at Bowdoin College.

Sleeper was a member of the Maine House of Representatives from South Berwick, Maine (1911–12) before being appointed by Democratic President Woodrow Wilson to the lucrative position of Port Collector in 1916.

References

1856 births
1924 deaths
People from South Berwick, Maine
Physicians from Maine
Medical School of Maine alumni
Members of the Maine House of Representatives
Collectors of the Port of Portland (Maine)